Sakett Saawhney is an Indian film and television producer from Mumbai, Maharashtra.

Career 
Saawhney began his career as an assistant director under Vivek Agnihotri on several projects, including the TV series Love Story, Saturday Suspense, and the X Zone episodic series. in 2003, Saawhney joined Balaji Telefilms as an executive producer, where he supervised the production of several shows and movies. he worked under the guidance of CEO Ramesh Sippy and was involved with the newly established Balaji Motion Pictures. In 2009, he resigned from his position as General Manager of Production. In early 2010, Saawhney founded Flying Turtle Films with Shabir Ahluwalia. By the end of 2013, he returned to Balaji Motion Pictures as Head of Production for Films, where he worked on several film projects until 2016. More recently, Saawhney produced the web series Fixerr for ALT Balaji and ZEE5 in 2019.

Early Life 
Saawhney spent his childhood years in Antop Hill, Mumbai with his parents. later, his family relocated to the western suburbs in Versova. He completed his education at Bhavan's School in Andheri. Saawhney later went on to study commerce at Mithibai College, but eventually decided to pursue a career in the entertainment industry.

Personal Life 
Saawhney's parents are originally from Kashmir and migrated to Delhi after the partition of India in 1948. His father, Brij Bhushan Saawhney, was a top graduate of the 1971 batch at the National School of Drama in Delhi. After moving to Mumbai, he worked in various film and television projects, including Nukkad, and had a long career as a senior announcer at All India Radio. He was known for providing the voice for hundreds of advertisements and dubbing the lead actors of many South Indian films into Hindi. Saawhney's mother, Asha Saawhney, was also a renowned announcer at All India Radio. Saawhney is married to Riti Saawhney.

Filmography

Films 
2008 - EMI (film) as General Manager of production 

2008 - C Kkompany as Associate producer 

2008 - Mission Istaanbul as General Manager of Production 

2009 - Toofan (2013 film) as Producer 

2009 - Zanjeer (2013 film) as Producer 

2014 - Main Tera Hero as Head of production 

2014 - Ragini MMS 2 as Head of production 

2014 - Ek Villain as Head of production 

2016 - Great Grand Masti as Associate producer 

2016 - Azhar as Associate producer 

2016 - Kyaa Kool Hain Hum 3 as Associate producer

Television 
1995 - Hum Paanch (TV series) as Head of Production 

1997 - Saturday Suspense as Assistant director 

1998 - Mastermind India as Production in-charge 

1998 - X Zone (Sikander) as Assistant director 

1999 - Rishtey (TV series) as Assistant director 

2000 - Kyunki Saas Bhi Kabhi Bahu Thi as Head of production 

2001 - Kkusum as Executive producer 

2003 - Kahiin to Hoga as Head of production 

2004 - Kesar as Executive producer 

2004 - Kitni Mast Hai Zindagi as Executive producer 

2004 - Kkoi Dil Mein Hai as Executive producer 

2005 - Kkavyanjali as Head of production 

2006 - Karam Apnaa Apnaa as Head of production 

2006 - Kasamh Se as Head of production 

2006 - Kyaa Hoga Nimmo Kaa as Head of production 

2007 - Kasturi (TV series) as Head of production 

2007 - Kayamath as  Head of production 

2008 - Kis Desh Mein Hai Meraa Dil as General manager of production 

2008 - Tujh Sang Preet Lagai Sajna as General manager of production 

2009 - Bairi Piya as General Manager of Production 

2009 - Bandani as General Manager of Production 

2009 - Kitani Mohabbat Hai as General Manager of Production 

2009 - Pavitra Rishta as General Manager of Production 

2009 - Pyaar Ka Bandhan as General Manager of Production 

2010 - Ganga Kii Dheej as Producer 

2013 - Kahaani Hamaaray Mahaabhaarat Ki as Head of production 

2013 - Savitri - EK Prem Kahani as Producer

Web series
2019 - Fixerr as Writer and Creator

2022 - Escaype Live as Executive producer

References

External Links 

Indian producers
1979 births
Living people